Flower on the Stone is a Soviet 1962 drama film directed by Anatoly Slesarenko and Sergei Parajanov.

The film premiere took place on 1 September 1962 in Kiev. The regular cinema screenings began on January 24, 1963. The film had a total of 5.2 million viewers.

Plot
In place of the Donetsk steppe, overgrown with chamomile and feather grass, a mining town is being developed. Brigadier of the youth mine Grigory Griva is in love with comrade Lyuda and therefore often openly sneers at her organizational skills. But when he is alone with her, he becomes timid and shy, for which he is angry with himself and makes up new pranks.

The second story is connected with the appearance of Christina in the mining town, a beautiful but closed-minded girl who falls under the influence of the presbyter of the sect. Komsomol member Arsen who has fallen in love with the girl helps her leave the sect.

Cast
Grigory Karpov – Grigory Griva, sinker
Lyudmila Cherepanova – Lyuda, the Komsomol of the mine
Inna Burduchenko – Christina, sectarian
Boris Dmokhovsky –  Pavel Fedorovich Varchenko, the head of the mine
Georgy Epifantsev – Arsen Zagorny
Mikhail Nazvanov – Zabroda, the librarian
Dmitry Franko – Pasha Chmykh
Vladimir Belokurov – father of Christina
Alexander Gai – father of Lyuda
Anatoly Soloviev – Peter the Great
Boryslav Brondukov – Kovalyov

Production
Because of lack of safety on the set actress Inna Burduchenko died during the filming. She initially became famous for playing the main role in the religious drama Ivanna. The director of the film Anatoly Slesarenko was prosecuted for this and convicted. Sergei Paradzhanov completed the work on the film and gave it a new title (the original one was Thus Nobody Loved).

References

External links
 

Dovzhenko Film Studios films
Soviet drama films
1962 drama films
1962 films
Films about mining
Films directed by Sergei Parajanov
Soviet black-and-white films
1960s Russian-language films